In biological morphology and anatomy, a sulcus (pl. sulci) is a furrow or fissure (Latin fissura, plural fissurae).  It may be a groove, natural division, deep furrow, elongated cleft, or tear in the surface of a limb or an organ, most notably on the surface of the brain, but also in the lungs, certain muscles (including the heart), as well as in bones, and elsewhere. Many sulci are the product of a surface fold or junction, such as in the gums, where they fold around the neck of the tooth.

In invertebrate zoology, a sulcus is a fold, groove, or boundary, especially at the edges of sclerites or between segments.

In pollen a grain that is grooved by a sulcus is termed sulcate.

Examples in anatomy

Liver
Ligamentum teres hepatis fissure
Ligamentum venosum fissure
Portal fissure, found in the under-surface of the liver
Transverse fissure of liver, found in the lower surface of the liver
Umbilical fissure, found in front of the liver

Lung
Azygos fissure, of right lung
Horizontal fissure of right lung
Oblique fissure, of the right and left lungs

Skull
Auricular fissure, found in the temporal bone
Petrotympanic fissure
Pterygomaxillary fissure
Sphenoidal fissure, separates the wings and the body of the sphenoid bone
Superior orbital fissure

Other types
 anal fissure, a break or tear in the skin of the anal canal
 anterior interventricular sulcus
 calcaneal sulcus
 coronal sulcus
 femoral sulcus or intercondylar fossa of femur
 fissure (dentistry), a break in the tooth enamel
 fissure of the nipple, a condition that results from running, breastfeeding and other friction-causing exposures
 fissured tongue, a condition characterized by deep grooves (fissures) in the tongue
 gingival sulcus
 gluteal sulcus
 Henle's fissure, a fissure in the connective tissue between the muscle fibers of the heart
 interlabial sulci
 intermammary sulcus
 intertubercular sulcus, the groove between the lesser and greater tubercules of the humerus (bone of the upper arm)
 lacrimal sulcus (sulcus lacrimalis)
 malleolar sulcus
 palpebral fissure, separates the upper and lower eyelids
 patellar sulcus or intercondylar fossa of femur
 posterior interventricular sulcus
 preauricular sulcus
 radial sulcus (musculospiral groove)
 sagittal sulcus
 separatoral sulcus (depression behind the brow ridges of some primates)
 sigmoid sulcus
 skin fissure, a linear-like cleavage of skin, sometimes defined as extending into the dermis
 sulcus arteriæ vertebralis
 sulcus subtarsalis in the eyelid
 sulcus tubae auditivae
  tympanic sulcus
 urethral sulcus
 Ventral median fissure, of the spinal cord

In neuroanatomy

Brain
Broca's fissure: found in the third left frontal fold of the brain.
Burdach's fissure: connects the brain's insula and the inner surface of the operculum.
Calcarine sulcus or Calcerine fissure: extends from the occipital of the cerebrum to the occipital fissure.
Callosomarginal fissure: found in the medial surface of the cerebrum.
Central sulcus or Rolando's fissure: separates the brain's frontal and parietal lobes.Clevenger's fissure: found in the inferior temporal lobe of the brainCollateral fissure: found in the inferior surface of the cerebrum.Fissure of Bichat: found below the corpus callosum in the cerebellum of the brain.Lateral sulcus or Fissure of Sylvius: separates the frontal and parietal lobes of the brain from the temporal lobe.Hippocampal sulcus: a sulcus that extends from the brain's corpus callosum to the tip of the temporal lobe.Horizontal fissure or Transverse fissure: found between the cerebrum and the cerebellum.  Note that a "transverse fissure" can also be found in the liver and lungs. Longitudinal fissure or Medial longitudinal fissure: which divides the cerebrum into the two hemispheres.Occipitoparietal fissure: found between the occipital and parietal lobes of the brain.Wernicke's fissure: separates the brain's temporal and parietal lobes from the occipital lobe. Zygal fissure'': found in the cerebrum.

In the brain a sulcus is a groove formed in the stage of gyrification by the folding of the cortex. There are many sulci and gyri formed.  A larger than usual sulcus may instead be called a fissure such as the longitudinal fissure that separates the two hemispheres.

See also
 Sinus (botany)
 Sulcus sign

References

Anatomy